Kazimierz Laskowski (7 November 1899 – 20 October 1961) was a Polish fencer and military officer. He won a bronze medal in the team sabre event at the 1928 Summer Olympics. Laskowski served since 1918 in the Polish Army. He fought in the September Campaign of World War II and eventually spent rest of the war in the POW camp.

References

External links
 

1899 births
1961 deaths
People from Troitsk, Chelyabinsk Oblast
People from Troitsky Uyezd
People from the Russian Empire of Polish descent
Polish male fencers
Olympic fencers of Poland
Fencers at the 1928 Summer Olympics
Olympic bronze medalists for Poland
Olympic medalists in fencing
Medalists at the 1928 Summer Olympics
Members of the Polish Gymnastic Society "Sokół"
Polish people of the Polish–Soviet War
Polish military personnel of World War II
Polish prisoners of war